Transcription factor II D (TFIID) is one of several general transcription factors that make up the RNA polymerase II preinitiation complex. RNA polymerase II holoenzyme is a form of eukaryotic RNA polymerase II that is recruited to the promoters of protein-coding genes in living cells. It consists of RNA polymerase II, a subset of general transcription factors, and regulatory proteins known as SRB proteins.  Before the start of transcription, the transcription Factor II D (TFIID) complex binds to the core promoter DNA of the gene through specific recognition of promoter sequence motifs, including the TATA box, Initiator, Downstream Promoter, Motif Ten, or Downstream Regulatory elements.

Functions
 Coordinates the activities of more than 70 polypeptides required for initiation of transcription by RNA polymerase II
 Binds to the core promoter to position the polymerase properly
 Serves as the scaffold for assembly of the remainder of the transcription complex
 Acts as a channel for regulatory signals

Structure
TFIID is itself composed of TBP and several subunits called TATA-binding protein Associated Factors (TBP-associated factors, or TAFs). In a test tube, only TBP is necessary for transcription at promoters that contain a TATA box. TAFs, however, add promoter selectivity, especially if there is no TATA box sequence for TBP to bind to. TAFs are included in two distinct complexes, TFIID and B-TFIID. The TFIID complex is composed of TBP and more than eight TAFs. But, the majority of TBP is present in the B-TFIID complex, which is composed of TBP and TAFII170 (BTAF1) in a 1:1 ratio. TFIID and B-TFIID are not equivalent, since transcription reactions utilizing TFIID are responsive to gene specific transcription factors such as SP1, while reactions reconstituted with B-TFIID are not.

Subunits in the TFIID complex include:
 TBP (TATA binding protein), or:
 TBP-related factors in animals (TBPL1; TBPL2)
 TAF1 (TAFII250)
 TAF2 (CIF150)
 TAF3 (TAFII140)
 TAF4 (TAFII130/135)
 TAF4B (TAFII105)
 TAF5 (TAFII100)
 TAF6 (TAFII70/80)
 TAF7 (TAFII55)
 TAF8 (TAFII43)
 TAF9 (TAFII31/32)
 TAF9B (TAFII31L)
 TAF10 (TAFII30)
 TAF11 (TAFII28)
 TAF12 (TAFII20/15)
 TAF13 (TAFII18)
 TAF15 (TAFII68)

See also 
 Eukaryotic transcription
 General transcription factor
 Preinitiation complex
 Regulation of gene expression
 RNA polymerase II holoenzyme
 TATA binding protein
 Transcription (genetics)

References

External links
 
 3D electron microscopy structures of TFIID from the EM Data Bank(EMDB)

Gene expression
Molecular genetics
Proteins
Transcription factors